Akhilesh Pratap Singh (born 21 May 1960) is an Indian politician and a member of the 16th Legislative Assembly of Uttar Pradesh. He represented the Rudrapur constituency of Uttar Pradesh until 2017 and is a member and spokesperson for the Indian National Congress party.

Early life and education
Akhilesh Pratap Singh was born in Deoria district. He attended the University of Allahabad and attained Master of Arts degree. Captained the Allahabad University and Allahabad District Basketball Team, representing them in state and national level events.

Political career
Akhilesh Pratap Singh has been a MLA for one term. He represented the Rudrapur constituency and is a member of the Indian National Congress  party.

Posts held

Personal life 
His brother KP Singh is a colonel in the Army Air Defence.

His nephew is Indian Air Force group captain Varun Singh, who lost his life in 2021 Indian Air Force Mil Mi-17 crash.

See also
 Rudrapur (Assembly constituency)
 Sixteenth Legislative Assembly of Uttar Pradesh
 Uttar Pradesh Legislative Assembly

References 

1960 births
Indian National Congress politicians
Living people
People from Deoria district
People from Uttar Pradesh
Uttar Pradesh MLAs 2012–2017
Uttar Pradesh politicians